This page details the qualifying process qualifying for the 1994 African Cup of Nations. Zaire was originally chosen to host the final tournament, however it was replaced by Tunisia.

The qualification took place in 8 groups. 10 teams would progress to the tournament. Ivory Coast and Tunisia qualified automatically as defending champions and hosts respectively. Qualification began on 14 June 1992 and ended on 24 October 1993.

Preliminary round

|}

Lesotho won 4–0 on aggregate.

Play-off

Guinea-Bissau won 1–0 after the play-off.

Qualifying round

Group 1

Group 2

Group 3
Algeria was disqualified for fielding ineligible player Mourad Karouf in the match against Senegal on 10 January 1993 in Dakar; their place was taken by Senegal who finished third.
Togo withdrew after completing 6 matches (4 draws, 2 losses); their results were annulled and are not listed below.

Group 4

Group 5

Group 6
Chad withdrew after competing two matches (lost both); their results were annulled and are not listed below.
Guinea and Burundi were tied; a play-off match was held in a neutral ground to determine who will qualify.

Play-off

Group 7
Tanzania and Burkina Faso withdrew after competing two matches each; their results were annulled and are not listed below.

Group 8
Libya and Mauritania withdrew without playing any matches.

Qualified teams
The 12 qualified teams are:

  (holders)
 
 
 
 
 
 
  *
 
  (host)
 
 

* Senegal replaced Algeria (disqualified)

References

External links
 African Nations Cup 1994 – rsssf.com

1994
Qual
Qual
qualification